The High Speed Thrill Coaster was a steel junior roller coaster which was located at Knoebels Amusement Resort in Elysburg, Pennsylvania.

History and architectural features
Built by the Overland Amusement Company, it opened in 1955 and operated until 2008. The installation at Knoebels was the last operating roller coaster in the world from Overland.

The layout consisted of a small,  lift hill, followed by a diving 180° turn and several small hills, ending with another 180° turn back to the station. High Speed Thrill Coaster lift was powered by a six-cylinder Ford engine. The operator could control the coaster's overall speed by adjusting the speed of the chain through a clutch lever to engage and disengage the engine from the lift chain.

The ride was dismantled beginning in late 2008. According to their website, the ride was "worn out". It was the first roller coaster to be built at Knoebels, and as such was the longest continually-operating roller coaster at the park. 

The area where the coaster was located at Knoebels – on the island above the motor boat trough – is still used for a junior roller coaster known as Kozmo's Kurves, the successor to High Speed Thrill Coaster that opened on August 1, 2009.

References 

Roller coasters manufactured by Overland Amusement Company
Former roller coasters in Pennsylvania
1955 establishments in Pennsylvania